Jaera is a genus of isopods in the family Janiridae. There are more than 20 described species in Jaera.

Species
These 22 species belong to the genus Jaera:

 Jaera albifrons Leach, 1814
 Jaera bocqueti Veuille & Kocatas, 1979
 Jaera caspica Kesselyak, 1938
 Jaera danubica Brtek, 2003
 Jaera forsmani Bocquet, 1950
 Jaera hopeana Costa, 1853
 Jaera ischiosetosa Forsman, 1949
 Jaera istri Veuille, 1979
 Jaera italica Kesselyak, 1938
 Jaera maculosa Leach, 1814
 Jaera marina
 Jaera nordica Lemercier, 1958
 Jaera nordmanni (Rathke, 1837)
 Jaera petiti Schulz, 1953
 Jaera posthirsuta Forsman, 1949
 Jaera praehirsuta Forsman, 1949
 Jaera sarsi Valkanov, 1936
 Jaera schellenbergi Kesselyak, 1938
 Jaera sorrentina Verhoeff, 1943
 Jaera syei Bocquet, 1950
 Jaera tyleri Brandt & Malyutina, 2014
 Jaera wakishiana Bate, 1865

References

External links

 

Asellota
Articles created by Qbugbot